Pseudochazara porphyritica is a species of butterfly in the family Nymphalidae. It is confined to Panjao –Pakistan, bordering Afghanistan.

Flight period 
Unknown.

Food plants
Larvae feed on grasses.

References

 Satyrinae of the Western Palearctic - Pseudochazara porphyritica

Pseudochazara
Butterflies described in 1956